Tiger Marching Band can refer to one of the following:

 GSU Tiger Marching Band, the marching band of Grambling State University
 Louisiana State University Tiger Marching Band